Wulfsige III (or Wulfsin, Vulsin, Ultius) was a medieval Bishop of Sherborne and is considered a saint.

Life

Wulfsige was nominated about 993. He died on 8 January 1002.

Wulfsige took part in the tenth century Benedictine monastic reform movement in England. He had been a monk of Glastonbury Abbey under Dunstan, became a monk of Westminster Abbey during Dunstan's tenure as Bishop of London, was appointed abbot of Westminster, probably from before 966, when he first occurs. He was appointed to Sherborne by King Edgar the Peaceful, and held the abbacy along with the bishopric of Sherborne until at least 997. It was as bishop of Sherborne that Wulfsige presided over the refoundation of the cathedral community as a Benedictine abbey in 998. In 1998 a one-day conference was held to celebrate the refoundation of the abbey of Sherbone, and a collection of essays, St Wulfsige and Sherborne, was published in 2005.

Wulfsige is considered a saint and Goscelin wrote a hagiography of him, which has been translated by Rosalind Love.

Monks of Ramsgate account

The monks of St Augustine's Abbey, Ramsgate wrote in their Book of Saints (1921),

Baring-Gould's account

Sabine Baring-Gould (1834–1924) in his Lives Of The Saints wrote under January 8,

Butler's account

The hagiographer Alban Butler (1710–1773) wrote in his Lives of the Fathers, Martyrs, and Other Principal Saints under January 8,

Citations

Sources

External links
 

Bishops of Sherborne (ancient)
11th-century deaths
11th-century English Roman Catholic bishops
Medieval English saints
1002 deaths
Year of birth unknown